The masculine first name Gregory derives from the Latin name "Gregorius", which came from the late Greek name "Γρηγόριος" (Grēgórios) meaning "watchful, alert" (derived from Greek "γρηγoρεῖν" "grēgorein" meaning "to watch"). This traditional meaning may be disputed, however, as modern dictionaries translate Γρήγορε (Gregore) as “swift, quick,” while “watchful, alert” are translated as “προσεκτικός” or “άγρυπνος.”

Through folk etymology, the name also became associated with Latin grex (stem greg–) meaning "flock" or "herd". This association with a shepherd who diligently guides his flock contributed to the name's popularity among monks and popes.

Sixteen popes and two antipopes have used the name Gregorius, starting with Pope Gregory I (Gregory the Great). It is tied with Benedict as the second-most popular name for popes, after John. 

Although the name was uncommon in the early 20th century, after the popularity of the actor Gregory Peck it became one of the ten most common male names in the United States in the 1950s and has remained popular since.

Name days
The Roman Catholic Church traditionally held the feast of Saint Gregory (the Great) on March 12, but changed it to September 3 in 1969. March 12 remains the name day for Gregory in most countries.

Gregory the Theologian (also known as Gregory of Nazianzus) is one of the Three Hierarchs (Ancient Greek: Οἱ Τρεῖς Ἱεράρχαι; Greek: Οι Τρεις Ιεράρχες). The other two are Basil the Great, also known as Basil of Caesarea and John Chrysostom.
All three have separate feast days in January: Basil on January 1, Gregory on January 25, and Chrysostom on January 27.

Forms in different languages
Albanian: Grigor, Gërgur
Amharic: ጎርጎሪዯስ (Gorgorios)
Arabic:   (Jirjir),  (Jurayj),  (Jirījūrī),  (Ghirīghūrī)
Armenian: Գրիգոր (Western Armenian: Krikor; Eastern Armenian: Grigor)
Belarusian:  (Ryhor)
Bengali: গ্রেগরি (Grēgari)
Bulgarian:  (Grigor)
Catalan: Gregori
Chinese: 格雷戈里 (Géléigēlǐ), 格里高利 (Gélǐgāolì)
Croatian: Grgur, Grga or Grgo
Czech: Řehoř
Danish: Gregers
Dutch: Gregoor, Gregorius
English: Gregory, also Gregg, Greg
Estonian: Reigo
Faroese: Grækaris
Finnish: Reijo or Reko
French: Grégory or Grégoire
Georgian: გრიგოლი (Grigoli, Grigori)
German: Gregor
Greek: Γρηγόριος (Grigorios, Gri̱górios, Gregorios), Γρηγόρης (Grigoris, Gregoris)
Gujarati: ગ્રેગરી (Grēgarī)
Hebrew: גרגורי
Hindi: ग्रेगोरी (Grēgōrī)
Hungarian: Gergely, Gergő or Transylvanian: Gerő
Icelandic: Gregor
Indonesian: Gregorius
Irish: Gréagóir
Italian: Gregorio
Japanese: Guregori (グレゴリー)
Kannada: ಗ್ರೆಗೊರಿ (Gregori)
Korean: 그레고리오 (Geulegolio)
Latin: Gregorius
Latvian: Gregors
Lithuanian: Grigalius, Grigas or Gregoras, Gregorijus
Macedonian: Григориј,  Grigorij
Marathi: ग्रेगोरी (Grēgōrī)
Mongolian: Грегори,  Gryegori
Nepali: ग्रेगरी,  Grēgarī
Norwegian: Greger or Gregers
Persian: گرگوری
Polish: Grzegorz
Portuguese: Gregório
Romanian: Grigore or Gligor
Russian:  (Grigoriy, Grigori, Grigory), with diminutives  (Grisha),  (Grishka)
Scots: Gregor
Serbian: Grigorije (Григорије), Gligorije (Глигорије), or Grgur (Гргур)
Slovak: , 
Slovene:  or  
Spanish: Gregorio
Swedish: Greger
Tamil: கிரிகோரி (Kirikōri)
Telugu: గ్రెగొరీ (Gregorī)
Thai: เกรกอรี or เกรกกอรี (Gregori, Greggori, Krekori, Krekkori)
Turkish: Krikor or Grigor
Ukrainian: Григорій (Hryhoriy), Гриць(ко) (Hryts(ko))
Urdu: گریگوری
Welsh: Grigor
Yiddish: גרעגאָרי, Gregori

People

Religious figures
Ordered chronological, when feasible
Pope Gregory (disambiguation), a list of popes and antipopes
Patriarch Gregory (disambiguation)
Saint Gregory (disambiguation)
Gregory Asbestas, archbishop of Syracuse
Gregory of Nin, 10th century Croatian bishop and reformer
Gregory of Narek (c. 950–1003/1011), Armenian monk, poet, philosopher and theologian
Gregory, Bishop of Győr (died 1241), Hungarian prelate
Gregory Palamas (c. 1296–1357 or 1359), theologian, archbishop and monk
Gregory of Rimini  (c. 1300–1358), philosopher and theologian
Gregory IV of Athens, Metropolitan of Athens 1827–1828
Gregory (Afonsky) (1925–2008), Archbishop of Sitka and Alaska 1973–1995
Gregory Karotemprel (born 1933), Syro-Malabar bishop

Aristocrats
Ordered chronologically
Gregory (exarch), Exarch of Ravenna 664-677
Gregory of Benevento (died 739/740), Italian duke
Gregory I of Naples, Duke of Naples (739–755)
Gregory II of Naples, Duke of Naples (767–794)
Gregory III of Naples, Duke of Naples (864–870)
Gregory IV of Naples, Duke of Naples (898–915)

Other
Ordered alphabetically
Greg Abbott (born 1957), American politician
Gregg Allman (1947–2017), American musician
Gregg Araki (born 1959), American film director
Gregory Berrios (born 1979), Puerto Rican volleyball player
 Gregory Glenn Biggs (1964-2001), homeless American murder victim struck by a car and left in the windshield to die
Greg Camarillo (born 1982), American football player
Gregory Chamitoff (born 1962), American astronaut
Gregory Chaney (born 1981), American politician
Gregory Charles (born 1968), Canadian musician and singer
Greg Davies (born 1968), Welsh comedian and actor
Greg Dobbs (born 1978), American baseball player
Grégory Galbadon (born 1973), French politician
Gregory Gaye (1900–1993), Russian-American actor
Greg Gianforte (born 1961), American businessman and politician
Gregory Gray (1959–2019), Northern Irish musician
Greg Hartle (born 1951), American football player
Gregory Helms (born 1974), American professional wrestler
Gregory Henriquez (born 1963), Canadian architect
Gregory Hines (1946–2003), American dancer, actor, singer and choreographer
Gregory Junior (born 1999), American football player
Greg Kindle (born 1950), American football player
Gregory La Cava (1892–1952), American film director
Grégory Labille (born 1968), French politician
Greg Lake (1947–2016), British musician, singer, and guitarist, founding member of King Crimson and Emerson, Lake & Palmer
Greg Lamberson (born 1964), American author and filmmaker
Grégory Lemarchal (1983–2007), French singer
Greg LeMond (born 1961), American professional road bicycle racer
Greg Louganis (born 1960), American Olympic champion diver and LGBT activist
Greg Luzinski (born 1950), American baseball player
Greg Maddux (born 1966), American baseball player
Gregory Mertens (1991–2015), Belgian footballer
Greg Norman (born 1955), Australian golfer and entrepreneur
Greg Page (musician) (born 1972), Australian musician and actor, founding member and original lead singer of The Wiggles
Gregory Peck (1916–2003), American actor
Gregory Porter (born 1971), American singer, songwriter, and actor
Greg Potter, American comic book writer
Gregory Renard (born 1995), better known as DJ Yung Vamp, Belgian DJ and record producer
Gregory Samantha Rosenthal (born 1983), American historian, writer, and activist
Gregory Rousseau (born 2000), American football player
Gregory Rudelson (born 1988), Israeli judoka and belt wrestler
Greg Rusedski (born 1973), Canadian-English tennis player
Gregory Rusland (b. 1959), Surinamese politician
Gregory Slaughter (b. 1988), basketball player
 Gregory Smith (born 1986), American professional wrestler better known as Gregory Iron
Gregory Tony (born 1978), American Sheriff of Broward County, Florida
Greg Tribbett (born 1968), guitarist of the American alternative metal band Mudvayne
Greg Weisman (born 1963), writer, actor, producer
Gregory Vargas (born 1986), Venezuelan basketball player
Grégory Villemin(1980-1984), French murder victim of the highly sensationalized Grégory Affair

Fictional characters
Gregory, protagonist of the video game Five Nights at Freddy's: Security Breach
Gregory, in the comic book series and television series, both titled The Walking Dead
Gregory Barrows, the main antagonist of Time Crisis 4
Gregory Herd, a fictional character appearing in Marvel Comics stories
Gregory Hirsch, cousin in the Roy family Succession
Gregory Heffley, protagonist of the Diary of a Wimpy Kid series
Gregory House, the main character of House
Gregor Samsa, the protagonist of Franz Kafka's novella The Metamorphosis

Animals 

 Gregory, a pet caracal, popularly known as Big Floppa

See also 
Grigory

References

Masculine given names
English given names
Given names of Greek language origin
English masculine given names

fr:Gregory